Paul Jolicoeur (born 1945) is a Québecois professor and doctor.

He has been a teacher since 1976 at the Faculty of Medicine at the Université de Montréal, where he holds the Canada Research Chair in infectious and parasitic diseases.  His principal specialisms are the detection of new oncogenes, the study of degenerative neurological illnesses and research into AIDS.

Honours/Awards
 1985 – Marcel-Piché Prize
 1986 – Medal of the Royal College
 1989 – Made a member of the Royal Society of Canada
 1992 – Received the Léo-Pariseau Prize

References

1945 births
Living people
Université de Montréal alumni
Fellows of the Royal Society of Canada
Academic staff of the Université de Montréal
Canada Research Chairs
Canadian neurologists
20th-century Canadian scientists
21st-century Canadian scientists